Shahzad Tareen (born 24 December 1988) is a Pakistani cricketer. He played in 39 first-class and 13 List A matches between 2007 and 2015. He made his Twenty20 debut on 7 February 2014, for Quetta Bears in the 2013–14 National T20 Cup.

References

External links
 

1988 births
Living people
Pakistani cricketers
Quetta cricketers
Quetta Bears cricketers
Place of birth missing (living people)